Faith Thomas  (born 22 January 1933) is an Australian former cricketer and hockey player. She was also a nurse in regional South Australia. Thomas is known for being the first Indigenous women to represent Australia in any sport as well as her distinguished service to the Australian Indigenous community.

Early life
Thomas was born at the Nepabunna Aboriginal Mission in South Australia. Her mother, Ivy, was an Adnyamathanha woman and her father German. Her mother took her to the Colebrook Home for Aboriginal Children in Quorn when she was a baby. She played cricket with other children at Colebrook using stones as balls, and making bats from wood they found.

Nursing career 
Thomas completed her nursing training at the Royal Adelaide Hospital, graduating in 1954. She was South Australia's first Indigenous nurse to be employed as a public servant. Thomas undertook midwifery training in Adelaide at Queen Victoria Hospital in Adelaide and in 1958 was employed to work at Raukkan (known then as Point McLeay Aboriginal Reserve). Thomas later went on to become a patrol nurse, spending much time living out of her car while on call.

Cricket career
After being introduced to cricket by a colleague at Royal Adelaide Hospital, Thomas made an immediate impact for her club side, taking a hat-trick in her second game. She was selected to play for the South Australia Women's cricket team after only three club games. She played for the her state side between 1956 and 1958.

In 1958 she was selected for the Australian national team.  She played her only international match against England. She was the first Aboriginal woman to be selected to represent Australia in sport, and until 2019 (following the selection of Ashleigh Gardner) was the only Indigenous woman to play test cricket for Australia. Thomas was selected in the squad to tour England and New Zealand after her test debuted but turned down the oppurtinity to focus on her nursing career.

Thomas was known for her fast bowling off a run up of just a few steps. She was renewed for her pace and skill of bowling  the yorker. Thomas's skill as a fast bolwer came from her time in Colebrook where she would throw rocks at Galahs. Thomas player her final club cricket game in the early 1960s. She was eight months pregnant at the time.

The WBBL plays an annual Faith Thomas match between the Adelaide Strikers and the Perth Scorchers to honor her achievements in both cricket and nursing.The winner of the match is presented with the Faith Thomas trophy.

References

Notes

Further reading

 

1933 births
Indigenous Australian cricketers
Australian nurses
Australia women Test cricketers
South Australia cricketers
Australian female field hockey players
Living people
Australian women nurses
Members of the Order of Australia
Sportswomen from South Australia
Australian people of Polish descent
Australian indigenous rights activists